Drew D. Perkins (born 1963) is a serial entrepreneur and is co-founder and CEO of Mojo Vision, a company developing Mojo Lens, the first true smart contact lens.

Early life and education
Perkins was born in 1963. He received a Bachelor of Science degree in electrical engineering, computer engineering, and mathematics from Carnegie Mellon University in 1986.

While at Carnegie Mellon, Perkins made several important contributions to the early internet:

 Created the popular CMU PC/IP software package for MS-DOS PCs
 Lead author of the Point-to-Point Protocol (PPP) and contributor to the standard for IP over IEEE 802 networks (e.g. Ethernet) and BOOTP (predecessor of DHCP)
 Began his first "company" and designed what may have been the world’s first Ethernet switch

Career

Entrepreneurial experience
Companies founded or materially developed by Perkins include:

 Mojo Vision, a company developing Mojo Lens, the first true smart contact lens.
 Gainspeed, which was sold to Nokia in 2016. Founded in 2012, Gainspeed raised $55 million in financing from investors including New Enterprise Associates, Andreessen Horowitz, Shasta Ventures, Technicolor, and Juniper Networks.
 Infinera, a public company which was co-founded by Perkins in 2001.
 OnFiber Communications, which was sold to Qwest Communications for $107 million in cash in 2006. Other owners of OnFiber Communications included Bear Stearns Merchant Banking (11%) and Kleiner Perkins Caufield & Byers (30%).
 Lightera Networks, co-founded by Perkins in 1998 and acquired by Ciena in 1999 in exchange for 20.6 million shares in Ciena.
 FORE Systems, where Perkins was principal architect from 1993 to 1997. The company was sold in 1999 for $4.5 billion.
Interstream, where Perkins developed advanced network file server products.

Writings 

 Perkins is one of the lead authors of the Point-to-Point Protocol (PPP), an early internet technology that provided access to the internet via the circuit-switched telephone system.

Awards and recognition 

 Perkins (E 1985) received the Alumni Achievement (Merit) Award from the CMU Alumni Association in 2005.

Philanthropy 

 Perkins has endowed the Drew D. Perkins Professorship in Advanced Networking and Communications at Carnegie-Mellon University.

Investments
Perkins participated in a $5 million seed financing for RevUp Software in March 2016.

Perkins participated in a $26 million Series B financing for Console Inc. in November 2015.

References

1963 births
Carnegie Mellon University alumni
Living people